"Shatlak's Song" is the national anthem of Chechnya, a republic of Russia. It was written by Akhmad Kadyrov and composed by Umar Beksultanov, and it was officially adopted in July 2010.

In Chechen, "Shatlak" can mean "state of glee" or "bird of paradise".

Lyrics

Regulations

The anthem of the Chechen Republic is performed when the Head of the Chechen Republic assumes office after taking the oath; at the opening and closing of the republic's parliamentary meetings; during the official ceremony of lifting the national flag; and during ceremonies of meetings and wires of delegations of foreign countries, intergovernmental organizations, and official visits to the republic by foreign head of states.

The anthem can also be played during the openings and closings of monuments, memorials, ceremonial meetings, holiday meetings, during other solemn and protocol events held by the state authorities of Chechnya, local self-government bodies, and state NGOs.

Additionally, the anthem is performed during official ceremonies during sports competitions in the Chechen Republic in accordance with the rules of holding these competitions (in particular, at the first and last home game of the "Terek Football Club" season).

See also
 Anthem of the Chechen Republic of Ichkeria

Notes

References

External links
 Listen online
 Chechen and Russian lyrics

Regional songs
Chechnya
Russian anthems
National anthems
Songs about indigenous peoples
National anthem compositions in B-flat major